Lars Dittmann Mikkelsen (born 6 May 1964) is a Danish actor. He has played Copenhagen mayoral election candidate Troels Hartmann in the drama series The Killing, Charles Augustus Magnussen in the third series of Sherlock, the Russian president Viktor Petrov in the American House of Cards on Netflix, and Grand Admiral Thrawn in Star Wars Rebels. In 2011, he won the Reumert Prize of Honour.

Early life
Mikkelsen was born in Gladsaxe near Copenhagen. He and his younger brother, actor Mads Mikkelsen, were raised in the Nørrebro district. After secondary school, he enlisted for military service in the Royal Danish Army. He then studied biology at the University of Copenhagen but gave up the course to earn his living as a street performer in European cities with his mime and juggling acts.

Acting career
At the age of 27, he enrolled at the National Theatre School of Denmark from which he graduated in 1995. In addition to his role in the drama series released worldwide as The Killing,  he subsequently appeared in two other internationally acclaimed Danish drama series, Those Who Kill and Borgen III. He also had a leading role in an episode of the BBC drama Sherlock as blackmailer Charles Augustus Magnussen. In the American television series House of Cards, he played the president of Russia. He won an International Emmy Award in 2018 for his role in Danish television drama Herrens Veje, which was broadcast in the UK in 2019 as Ride Upon the Storm.

In addition to his native Danish, Mikkelsen speaks fluent Swedish, German and English, and he has mastered various accents. He has stated that he and his brother first picked up English by listening to Monty Python records and learning the comedy sketches.

Personal life
Mikkelsen is married to actress Anette Støvelbæk. They have been a couple since 1986 and married in 1989. They have two sons. He is the older brother of actor Mads Mikkelsen.
While filming the second season of Ride Upon the Storm, he went to see a priest and asked to be baptised into the National Church of Denmark.

Filmography

Film

Television

Animated films/series/shorts

References

External links 
 

Living people
1964 births
20th-century Danish male actors
21st-century Danish male actors
Danish male television actors
Danish male voice actors
Place of birth missing (living people)
Danish male film actors
University of Copenhagen alumni
People from Gladsaxe Municipality
Danish Lutherans
International Emmy Award for Best Actor winners